Edith Mary Sharpe (14 September 1894 – 6 June 1984) was a British actress. Born in Hackney, London. She married Alexander Francis Part in 1931 and  had one child.
She appeared in TV series such as Dixon of Dock Green, Z Cars, Emergency Ward 10, and Probation Officer (TV series).
Her last known TV appearance was in War and Peace (1972 TV series). She died in Harrow on the Hill, London, aged 89.

Selected filmography
 The Education of Elizabeth (1921) - Lucy Fairfax
 Music Hath Charms (1935) - Miss Wilkinson
 Broken Blossoms (1936) - Mrs. Reed
 The Tenth Man (1936) - Miss Hobbs
 Old Mother Riley (1937) - Matilda Lawson
 When the Bough Breaks (1947) - Matron
 The Guinea Pig (1948) - Mrs. Hartley
 That Dangerous Age (1949) - Angela Caine
 Landfall (1949) - Mrs. Chambers - Rick's Mother
 No Place for Jennifer (1950) - The Doctor
 Once a Sinner (1950) - Mrs. Ross
 Cloudburst (1951) - Mrs. Reece
 The Death of the Heart (1956) - Mrs. Heccomb
 My Guess Would be Murder - (1957) - Alice Hunter
 Brothers in Law (1957) - Mrs. Thursby
 Happy Is the Bride (1958) - Mildred Royd
 The Inn of the Sixth Happiness (1958) - Secretary at China Inland Mission
 A French Mistress (1960) - Matron
 Francis of Assisi (1961) - Donna Pica
 Cash on Demand (1961) - Miss Pringle
 Satan Never Sleeps (1962) - Sister Theresa
 Incident (1965) - Mrs. Blake - (short)

References

External links

1890s births
1984 deaths
English film actresses
Actresses from London
20th-century English actresses
People from Hackney Central